The Battle of South Henan, was one of the 22 major engagements between the National Revolutionary Army (NRA) and Imperial Japanese Army during the Second Sino-Japanese War.  This battle was the first time the NRA engaged the Japanese in southern Henan.

In January 1941, the Japanese 11th Army split into three routes to attack the Chinese positions. Their main objective was to eradicate Chinese control of the Ping-Han Railway's southern section.  Li Zongren, commander of the Chinese 5th War Area, avoided frontal contact with the Japanese as much as possible. Instead, he fought conservatively, diverting his main forces towards the two flanks. Outflanked, the Japanese retreated after taking heavy casualties, and their attack was repelled.

See also
 Order of Battle: Battle of South Henan

References

South Henan
South Henan 1940
1941 in China
1941 in Japan
History of Henan
January 1941 events
February 1941 events
March 1941 events